The IBM Card-Programmed Electronic Calculator or CPC was announced by IBM in May 1949. Later that year an improved machine, the CPC-II, was also announced.

The original CPC Calculator has the following units interconnected by cables:
Electronic Calculating Punch
IBM 604 with reader/punch unit IBM 521
Accounting Machine
IBM 402 or
IBM 417

The CPC-II Calculator has the following units interconnected by cables:
Electronic Calculating Punch
IBM 605 with punch unit IBM 527
Accounting Machine
IBM 407 or
IBM 412 or
IBM 418
Optional Auxiliary Storage Units (up to 3)
IBM 941, each could store 16 decimal numbers with ten digits plus sign.

From the IBM Archives:
The IBM Card-Programmed Electronic Calculator was announced in May 1949 as a versatile general purpose computer designed to perform any predetermined sequence of arithmetical operations coded on standard 80-column punched cards. It was also capable of selecting and following one of several sequences of instructions as a result of operations already performed, and it could store instructions for self-programmed operation. The Calculator consisted of a Type 605 Electronic Calculating Punch and a Type 412 or 418 Accounting Machine. A Type 941 Auxiliary Storage Unit was available as an optional feature. All units composing the Calculator were interconnected by flexible cables. If desired, the Type 412 or 418, with or without the Type 941, could be operated independently of the other machines. The Type 605 could be used as a Calculating Punch and the punch unit (Type 527) could be operated as an independent gang punch.

Customer deliveries of the CPC began in late 1949, at which time more than 20 had been ordered by government agencies and laboratories and aircraft manufacturers. Nearly 700 CPC systems were delivered during the first-half of the 1950s.

See also
 List of vacuum tube computers

References

 Includes a 2-page listing Program Card Codings

 Many articles about the IBM CPC and 604.

External links
IBM Archives: Card-Programmed Electronic Calculator (CPC)
 History of the IBM CPC at Stanford University 
 "IBM Card Programmed Computer (CPC)" photograph at the Computer History Museum

CPC
Electro-mechanical computers
IBM vacuum tube computers
Programmable calculators
Computer-related introductions in 1949